Palo Macho (born 22 September 1965, in Streženice) is a Slovak painter specializing in the work with glass - creating glass panes, glass graphics, glass reliefs and other glass objects.

Education

 1980-1983: Secondary School of Glasspainting, Nový Bor, Czech Republic
 1983-1986: Secondary School of Art Glass, Kamenický Šenov, Czech Republic
 1989-1995: Academy of Fine Art, Bratislava, Slovakia
 1993: École de Beaux-Arts, Saint-Étienne, France
 1997: Cité International des Arts, Paris, France

Selection of exhibitions

 1996 - Via Lucis, Chateau Musée, Boulogne-sur-Mer, France
 1997 - Galerie Art et Creation, Lyon, France
 1999 - Steninge World Exhibition of Art Glass, Märsta, Sweden
 2001 - Glasgalerie Linz, Linz, Austria
 2003 - Forms and Faces, Budapest, Hungary - solo exhibition
 2003 - Art Glass Society Conference, Global Art Venue, Seattle, United States
 2004 - Fragmenty (z Fullu), Slovak National Gallery, Bratislava, Slovakia - solo exhibition
 2005 - Bienale, Märsta, Sweden
 2006 - Coburg Glass Prize, Coburg, Germany
 2007 - Art Glass, Riihimäki-Museum of glass, Helsinki, Finland
 2007 - In extenso, Oravská galéria, Dolný Kubín, Slovakia - solo exhibition...

Personal life

From 1994 to 1998 Palo Macho taught at The Secondary School of Fine Arts in Lednické Rovne.

Besides his work with glass, Palo Macho has also published two collections of poetry, Strelné modlitby (Firing Prayers) in 1995 and Mesiac na červeno (Moon in Red) in 2006.

References

External links
 The web presentation of Palo Macho's works

Slovak artists
1965 births
Living people
Slovak painters
Modern painters